Parlington is a settlement and civil parish about a mile from Aberford, in the Leeds district, in the county of West Yorkshire, England. In 2001 the parish had a population of 87. The parish touches Aberford, Barwick in Elmet and Scholes, Lotherton cum Aberford, Micklefield and Sturton Grange. Aberford & District Parish Council includes Parlington along with Aberford, Lotherton cum Aberford and Sturton Grange. There are plans to built a garden village in Parlington.

Landmarks 
There are 18 listed buildings in Parlington.

History 
The name "Parlington" means 'Farm/settlement connected with Pertel'. Parlington is a possible deserted medieval village, Hillam in the parish of Parlington has earthworks of a deserted medieval village. Parlington was recorded in the Domesday Book as Perlinctune/Perlintun/Pertilinctun/Pertilintun. Parlington was a township in the parish of Aberford, it became a separate parish in 1866.

See also 
 Parlington Hall

References 

 

Villages in West Yorkshire
Civil parishes in West Yorkshire
Places in Leeds